Vidya Dharma Pracharini Nepali Samiti is a Nepali committee in Varanasi, India. Established for Propagation of Sanatan Dharma and for maintenance of Nepali Dharamshala (type of building), religious rest house in Varanasi and helping awarding education to Nepalis traveling to Vanaras for education. It also awards and auspices Madan Smarak Samman puraskar.

See also
Jagadamba Nepali Dharmashala

References

Buildings and structures in Varanasi
Dharmshalas
Organisations based in Varanasi
Year of establishment missing